Aanachandam is a 2006 Indian Malayalam language film directed by Jayaraj and starring Jayaram, Remya Nambeesan, Sai Kumar, Innocent, Cochin Haneefa, Salim Kumar anf Jagathy Sreekumar. It was released in 2006. This film was a commercial success and critically acclaimed.. It ran for about 100 days in the central Kerala regions of Thrissur, Thripunithura and Ottappalam. It was the second highest-grossing Malayalam films of 2006, though it was released along with the movie Classmates during Onam holidays that year.

Plot
Aanachandam is about Krishna Prasad who is crazy about elephants. When he was a ten-year-old, his father had taken him to the village temple to attend the festival. An elephant which ran amok during the festival knocked the boy over, placed his front foot on the lad's chest, but then spared him.

His love for elephants started on that day. He started studying about elephants and their habits. His regular education suffered upsetting his people at home. He failed in several jobs in which elephants had a role to play. Debts began to mount. It is at this juncture that Gowri and her mother come to stay with him. He gives them shelter.

Anirudhan is the very opposite of what Krishna Prasad is. An owner of seven elephants, he has hardly any love for the animals and uses them only as a means to earn income.

Cast

Soundtrack 
The film's soundtrack contains 8 songs, all composed by Jaison J. Nair. Lyrics by Kanesh Punoor and P. C. Aravindan.

References

External links 
 

2006 films
Films shot in Palakkad
Films shot in Thrissur
2000s Malayalam-language films